Berckmans is a Flemish surname. Notable people with the surname include: 

Arthur Berckmans (1929–2020), Belgian comics author better known as Berck
Baron Louis Berckmans (1801–1883), Belgian medical doctor and horticulturist
Jean-Marie Berckmans (1953–2008), Belgian author

Surnames of Belgian origin